"When the Lights Go Down" is the fourth single released from American DJ Armand Van Helden's sixth album, Nympho. It features samples from Nick Gilder's song "Rockaway", so he and James McCulloch are given writing credits. The song was released in Australia on September 12, 2005, and reached number 52 on the ARIA Singles Chart. In Europe, the song stalled at number 70 in the United Kingdom but entered the top 10 in Finland, where it reached number eight.

Track listing
UK and Australian CD single
 "When the Lights Go Down" (radio edit)
 "When the Lights Go Down" (original club mix)
 "When the Lights Go Down" (Deepgroove's Dirty House dub remix)
 "When the Lights Go Down" (Backstage Sluts Drama remix)
 "When the Lights Go Down" (Paul Masterson's Subway remix)
 "When the Lights Go Down" (Trophy Twins Digital dub remix)

Charts

Release history

References

2005 singles
2005 songs
Armand Van Helden songs
Shock Records singles
Songs written by Armand Van Helden
Songs written by Nick Gilder